No Smoke Without Fire is the ninth studio album by English rock band Wishbone Ash. It was the first album since 1972's Argus to be produced by Derek Lawrence. The album peaked at No. 43 in the UK Albums Chart.

Track listing
All songs written and composed by Laurie Wisefield except where noted.

Side one
"You See Red" – 6:03
"Baby the Angels Are Here" (Martin Turner) – 4:44
"Ships in the Sky" – 3:02
"Stand and Deliver" – 7:35

Side two
"Anger in Harmony" (Andy Powell, Wisefield, Turner) – 5:00
"Like a Child" (Turner) – 4.53
"The Way of the World (Part 1)" – 4:09
"The Way of the World (Part 2)" – 5:32

Personnel
Wishbone Ash
Martin Turner – bass guitar, vocals
Andy Powell – guitar, vocals
Laurie Wisefield – guitar, vocals
Steve Upton – drums

Production
Derek Lawrence – producer
Rafe McKenna – engineer
Peter Wandless – assistant engineer
Hipgnosis – cover design, photography
Colin Elgie – graphics
Richard Draper – cover model
Peter Christopherson – cover model

Charts

References

1978 albums
Albums produced by Derek Lawrence
Albums with cover art by Hipgnosis
Wishbone Ash albums
MCA Records albums